The 1985 NBL Finals was the championship series of the 1985 season of Australia's National Basketball League (NBL). The Brisbane Bullets defeated the Adelaide 36ers to win their first NBL championship.

Format
The 1985 National Basketball League Finals was played between 24 August and 7 September between the top six teams of the regular season, consisting of two Quarter finals, two Semi-finals and the Grand Final. All Finals games were sudden death and for the first time the higher placed teams were given home court advantage. The top two teams of the regular season, the Brisbane Bullets and Adelaide 36ers, automatically qualified to host their respective Semi-finals.

Qualification

Qualified teams

Ladder

Quarter finals

(3) Canberra Cannons vs (5) Coburg Giants

(4) Nunawading Spectres vs (6) Newcastle Falcons

Semi-finals

(2) Adelaide 36ers vs (6) Newcastle Falcons

(1) Brisbane Bullets vs (6) Canberra Cannons

Grand final

(1) Brisbane Bullets vs (2) Adelaide 36ers

See also
 1985 NBL season

References

Finals
National Basketball League (Australia) Finals